Nihat Baştürk (born 23 October 1973 in Afyon, Turkey) is a Turkish footballer who plays for Turkish amateur-side Afjet Afyonspor. He spent the majority of his career with Gençlerbirliği, playing 12 seasons of Süper Lig football in Turkey. The midfielder then had a season's stint with Antalyaspor in Turkey's First League (Second Tier Football) before spending a couple seasons with Second League side, Fethiyespor. For the 2008/2009 season, the 35-year-old joined another Second League side, Afyonkarahisarspor, the club of his hometown.

International career
Baştürk was an unused substitute for Turkey's 1998 FIFA World Cup qualification group match against Wales on 20 August 1997.

Honours 
 Gençlerbirliği
Turkish Cup (1): 2001

References

External links
 Profile at TFF.org

1973 births
Living people
Gençlerbirliği S.K. footballers
Antalyaspor footballers
Turkish footballers
Süper Lig players

Association football midfielders